Global Bio-Chem Technology Group, also known as simply Global Bio-Chem, is a Chinese biotechnology company based in Hong Kong. The company is owned by Changchun Dacheng Industry Group.

Business
Global Bio-Chem is involved in the manufacture, research and development of corn-based biochemical products in China. It is headquartered in Hong Kong, with its production facilities based in Changchun and Dehui, within the Jilin province, Northeast China.

History
The company was established in 1994 and listed on the Hong Kong Stock Exchange in 2001. It spun off its sweeteners business, Global Sweeteners, on the Hong Kong Stock Exchange in 2007.

See also
Global Sweeteners

References

External links

Food and drink companies of Hong Kong
Chemical companies established in 1994
Food and drink companies established in 1994
1994 establishments in Hong Kong
Companies listed on the Hong Kong Stock Exchange